Magic Kingdom was a small amusement park located in Lansvale, New South Wales, Australia. It is now closed.

History and operation
The park operated in the 1970s, 1980s and early 1990s. The park was closed not long after Wonderland Sydney opened.

The park was promoted on television with commercials featuring the song "Magic" by the band Pilot.

Some of the rides were sourced from Luna Park after Luna Park closed in 1979 following the Ghost Train tragedy.

Magic Kingdom was popular at its peak but due to size and location (it could only be accessed by a road which went through an industrial area and residential area) the park struggled to remain viable.

The land was sold to developers in 2017. Flooding issues with the nearby Prospect Creek have limited its potential for new construction.

Attractions
Features included:

 Over 15 rides
 Slides (Two open water slides (95 metres long) plus a giant dry slide)
 Radio-controlled cars
 Picnic area with  barbecue facilities
 Big Shoe
 Petrol-powered mini-boats on a lake
 In the 1990s' bungy jumping was available at the park.

References

External links 
 Video of the amusement park on YouTube

Defunct amusement parks in Australia
Amusement parks in New South Wales
1970s establishments in Australia
1970 establishments in Australia